Xenophrys robusta, commonly known as the Bengal spadefoot toad, robust spadefoot toad, or white-lipped horned toad, is a species of toad found in eastern Nepal and north-eastern India. It is associated with riparian vegetation in tropical moist forests.

References

Xenophrys
Frogs of India
Amphibians of Nepal
Amphibians described in 1908
Taxa named by George Albert Boulenger